Joshua Seth is an American voice actor, comedian, and author.

Biography
Seth was born in Kent, Ohio, and graduated from New York University Tisch School of the Arts. As a child, Seth attended several experimental programs at Kent State University where he was admitted at the age of eight. Later, he attended Hampshire College and the New York University's film school Tisch School of the Arts where he trained as a performing artist. He has voiced many popular anime characters, including Taichi "Tai" Kamiya in Digimon Adventure series. He was the announcer of "Kids WB's Aftertoons Show" block and "Saturdays: Unleashed" block. 

He retired from voice acting in 2006 to focus on his other works.

From 2006 to 2020, Seth toured the world as a mentalist and magician. He has won awards from Hollywoodʼs Magic Castle, appeared in five of his own TV specials in Japan and South Korea and performed at over 2,000 events in over 30 countries.

Between 2016 and 2018, he came out of voice acting retirement to star in all of the Digimon Adventure tri. movies, recorded in Hollywood, CA. He then reprised his role in Digimon Adventure: Last Evolution Kizuna in 2020.

He returned to non Digimon voice acting (having retired from voice acting, with the exception of Digimon) in December 2022 with the role of Kaneda in The Prince of Tennis.

Seth is also motivational speaker and the author of a book on peak performance called Finding Focus In A Changing World.

He lives in St. Petersburg, Florida.

Filmography

Animated series English dubbing
 Arc the Lad - Elk
 The Big O - Cop
 The Black Angel - Kosugi's Guard
 Cowboy Bebop - McIntyre
 Cyborg 009: The Cyborg Soldier - Joe Shimamura/Cyborg 009
 Daigunder - Ryugu
 Digimon Adventure - Taichi "Tai" Kamiya, Motimon, Tentomon (ep.1), Pabumon, Pumpkinmon
 Digimon Adventure 02 - Taichi "Tai" Kamiya. Motimon, Tai's son
 Digimon Tamers - Kumbhiramon
 Digimon Frontier - Wizardmon, Teppei, Yutaka Himi
 Dual! Parallel Trouble Adventure - Kazuki Yotsuga
 Duel Masters - Shobu Kirifuda (Season One)
 Eagle Riders - Additional Voices
 éX-Driver - Souichi Sugano
 Flint the Time Detective - Unita, Additional Voices
 Ghost in the Shell: Stand Alone Complex - Omba (Ep. 9 & 11)
 Giant Robo - Daisaku Kusama
 Honeybee Hutch - Hutch
 IGPX - Takeshi Noa (micro-series only)
 Last Exile - Dio Eraclea
 Little Women - Theodore "Laurie" Laurence
 Macross Plus - Additional Voices
 Moldiver - Nozomu Ozora
 Nightwalker: The Midnight Detective - Schoolboy
 Orguss - Additional Voices
 Pilot Candidate - Zero Enna
 Pokémon - Kids WB Announcer
 The Return of Dogtanian - Philippe
 Rurouni Kenshin - Eiji Mishima
 Saint Tail - Asuka Jr.
 Samurai Girl Real Bout High School - Daisaku Kamiya
 Simsala Grimm - Doc Croc (Saban dub)
 Speed Racer X - Sparky
 Tenchi in Tokyo - Additional Voices
 The Prince of Tennis - Kenada
 Tokyo Pig - Spencer Weinberg-Takahama
 Transformers: Robots in Disguise - Carl
 Trigun - Young Knives
 The Twelve Kingdoms - Ikuya Asano
 Urda - Alan
 Vampire Princess Miyu - Helmsman, Young Maki, Yang
 Wolf's Rain - Hige
 X - Additional Voices
 Yukikaze - Ito
 Zatch Bell! - Maruss
 Zenki - Akira, Goki

Animated films English dubbing
 Akira - Tetsuo Shima (Pioneer dub)
 Cardcaptor Sakura: The Sealed Card (2nd Movie), Leave It to Kero (short) - Takashi Yamazaki
 Digimon: The Movie - Taichi "Tai" Kamiya (Born of Koromon and Our War Game!)
 Digimon Adventure tri. - Taichi "Tai" Kamiya, Motimon
 Digimon Adventure: Last Evolution Kizuna - Taichi "Tai" Kamiya
 DNA Sights 999.9 - Tetsuro Daiba
 Mobile Suit Gundam F91 - Arthur Jung

Animations
 All Grown Up! - Yu-Got
 The Batman - Kids WB Announcer
 Jin Jin and the Panda Patrol - Additional Voices
 The Little Polar Bear - Lemming #1
 Saban's Adventures of Oliver Twist - Additional Voices
 Totally Spies! - Arnold
 Wow! Wow! Wubbzy! - Additional Voices

Films
 50 First Dates - Painter (uncredited)
 Gorgeous - Additional Voices 
 Racing Stripes - Additional Voices
 The SpongeBob SquarePants Movie - Prisoner

Video games
 Ape Escape: On the Loose - Jake
 Digimon Rumble Arena - Taichi "Tai" Kamiya
 JumpStart - Pierre, C.J.
 JumpStart Advanced 1st Grade - Jimmy Bumples
 Stonekeep - Grug, Ice Sharga Guard, Tiny Sharga
 Xenosaga Episode II: Jenseits von Gut und Bose - chaos, Hermann
 Xenosaga Episode III: Also sprach Zarathustra - chaos

References

External links
 
 
 

Living people
American magicians
American male voice actors
Hampshire College alumni
Kent State University alumni
Tisch School of the Arts alumni
People from Kent, Ohio
Year of birth missing (living people)